The Lanang Bridge, Sarawak State Route Q326, is a 1.2-km toll bridge in Sibu, Sarawak, Malaysia. It was constructed in 2003 by a local concessionaire, Woodville Development Sdn. Bhd., a subsidiary of Shin Yang Group, to replace the former river ferry service crossing the Batang Rajang. The bridge, together with a series of states highways linking Sibu to Sarikei (Jalan Teluk Assan Q326, Jalan Tanjung Genting Q576, Jalan Kelupu Q206, Sarikei-Bintangor Highway Q345, and Sarikei-Pasi-Meradong Highway Q575), forms an alternative route for the Sarikei-Sibu section of the Pan Borneo Highway. Built at the total cost of RM 180 million, the bridge was opened to motorists on 11 April 2006.

Overview

The bridge is built at 6 km upstream of the Sibu town centre with dual carriageway. The bridge joins Lanang road and Paradom road across the river.

Toll collection and subsequent abolishment
A toll plaza was built at 435 metres away from the bridge on the side of the Paradom road. The bridge was meant for toll collection for 22 years.

The bridge was heavily criticised by motorists, especially the residents of Sarikei and Sibu, who regularly use the toll bridge for its ridiculously expensive toll rates. For instance, cars are charged at RM3.00 per crossing, which translates to RM2.50 per kilometre. Motorcycles are also charged at RM0.50. As a result, car drivers frequently commuting from Sarikei to Sibu and vice versa may need to spend as much as RM300 monthly for the toll bridge alone.

Due to the criticisms by local residents, on 2011 the federal government proposed to take over the bridge and abolish the toll collection.

On 29 April 2015, the then-Chief Minister (nowadays Premier) of Sarawak Adenan Satem announced that the toll were completely abolished on May 25 that year, along with the other 2 toll bridges in the state.

List of junctions

References

Roads in Sarawak
Bridges in Sarawak
Toll bridges in Malaysia
Highways in Malaysia